Smilets is a village near Strelcha, western Bulgaria. As of 2005 it has 418 inhabitants. It is named after the unsuccessful Medieval emperor of Bulgaria Smilets (1292- 1298).

Villages in Pazardzhik Province